This is a list of members of the Victorian Legislative Assembly from 2010 to 2014:

 On 21 December 2010, the Labor member for Broadmeadows and former Premier of Victoria, John Brumby, resigned. Labor candidate Frank McGuire won the resulting by-election on 19 February 2011.
 On 27 January 2012, the Labor member for Niddrie, Rob Hulls, resigned. Labor candidate Ben Carroll won the resulting by-election on 24 March 2012.
 On 7 May 2012, the Labor member for Melbourne, Bronwyn Pike, resigned. Labor candidate Jennifer Kanis won the resulting by-election on 21 July 2012.
 On 18 February 2013, the Labor member for Lyndhurst, Tim Holding, resigned. Labor candidate Martin Pakula won the resulting by-election on 27 April 2013.
 On 6 March 2013, the member for Frankston, Geoff Shaw, resigned from the parliamentary Liberal Party and moved to the crossbenches as an independent.

Members of the Parliament of Victoria by term
21st-century Australian politicians